Nina and the Neurons is a British television programme shown on the CBeebies channel, aimed at the children to help them understand basic science. Nina is a neuroscientist who enlists the help of five Neurons (animated characters representing the senses) in her brain to answer a scientific question. 

The show is produced by Lucille McLaughlin, who has also produced the children's programmes Balamory, Me Too! and Bits and Bobs. The series is commissioned by CBeebies Controller, Michael Carrington

Synopsis
Most of the show is based at Glasgow Science Centre, with a small part taking place outdoors. At the start of the show, Nina conducts experiments in front of an unseen audience of children. At one point of the show, Nina is 'contacted' by (usually two or three, but rarely four) children, who appear on a computer screen asking a science-related question (e.g., 'What makes rainbows appear and disappear?') Nina then chooses one (or more) of the five Neurons inside her brain based upon which of the senses is most appropriate to answer the question. Once the Neuron has been selected by Nina, the children (called the 'experimenters') then visit Nina, using fun experiments and games.

Afterwards, Nina takes the children out to find out more about the answer to the question, sometimes with the help of their friends and family. After they have found out the answer to the question, they travel back to the Glasgow Science Centre to do another experiment. Then, the 'experimenters' leave.

At the end of each show, a song is sung, which changes from series to series depending on the theme of the series. Then, the Neurons discuss what they have done and the individual role they have played. The show ends with Nina and the Neurons bidding farewell to the viewers.

Characters and cast
The main character of Nina is played by Scottish actress Katrina Bryan. She is a scientist who works in the lab. Nina wears a white lab coat with brightly coloured cuffs and lapels in her lab, and either a bright yellow coat or a blue jacket when outside. In the programme, Nina drives either a pale blue 1970s Volkswagen Type 2 (Transporter) minibus or a New MINI, both bearing numberplates reading 'NINA', or rides a bicycle in the Go ECO! version.

The Neurons are five computer-animated human characters (stylised with human facial features and body, but no legs) who live together inside Nina's brain, with no legs, and are named to reflect the five senses which they represent:

Felix, voiced by James Dreyfus in the first series but subsequently by Lewis MacLeod from the second series to the eleventh series, represents touch, and feel . He is green and also the oldest Neuron, speaks in a posh accent and is particular about his appearance.

Belle, voiced by Kelly Harrison, represents hearing, and sound. She has a pink face & a red body but also loud and can be bossy. she speaks in a yorkshire accent, She's also the group vice leader.

Luke, voiced by Patrice Naiambana, represents sight, and looking. He is yellow and is also the group leader. His character is laid back and relaxed, and speaks with a Jamaican accent.

Ollie, voiced by Siobhan Redmond, represents smell, and scent. She speaks with a Scottish accent, just like Bud. She is purple and described as 'sweet, self-assured and a bit of a goth.' She is the elder sister of Bud. 

Bud, voiced by Sharon Small, represents taste, and eating. He speaks with a Scottish accent, just like Ollie. He is blue and also the youngest Neuron and can be enthusiastic and easily excited. He is the younger brother of Ollie.

Bud and Ollie are often chosen together by Nina due to the way taste, eating, smell and scent all work together. *Note* they were only chosen together in the first episode of “In The Lab”.

Felix and Luke got chosen together by Nina due to the way touch, feel, sight and looking all work together.

Belle and Luke got chosen together by Nina due to the way hearing, sound, sight and looking all work together.

Felix and Belle got chosen together by Nina due to the way touch, feel, hearing and sound all work together.

 All 5 Neurons got chosen together by Nina due to the way touch, feel, hearing, sound, sight, looking, smell, scent, taste and eating all work together.

Awards and nominations

 BAFTA Scotland 2007
 Awarded Best Children's Programme
 BAFTA Scotland 2008
 Nominated as Best Children's Programme
Composer: Scottish Composer Graham Ness

Exhibits
There is a themed Nina & the Neurons activity trail at the Glasgow Science Centre.. 
There was also an attraction located at Alton Towers themed to the show called Nina's Science Lab which opened in 2014 and closed in 2018.

Episodes
The first series began on 26 February 2007 and ended on 30 March 2007. The 2nd series began airing on Cbeebies on 31 March 2008 and ended on 2 May 2008. It was followed by a third, this time called Nina and the Neurons: Go Eco!, on 13 June 2008 as part of CBeebies' year-long green initiative called EcoBeebies, which ended on 15 August 2008. A fourth series called Nina and the Neurons: Go Inventing started on 18 May 2009, where Nina invites several young inventors to her lab to discover how things work by inventing their own versions. It ended on 19 June 2009. The fifth series, Nina and the Neurons: In The Lab, was broadcast from 27 September 2010 to 10 December 2010. In the show, Nina and the experimenters discover changes and reaction.

A sixth series, called Nina and the Neurons: Brilliant Bodies, premiered on 5 September 2011. The show focuses on the parts of the human body. The seventh series, Nina and the Neurons: Go Engineering, is another series about inventions. It started in 2012. Series 8 is called Nina and the Neurons: Earth Explorers, explores the Earth, the sea and beyond. The series also started in 2013. The last three series, Get Sporty (2014), Go Digital (2014) and Get Building (2015) focus on sport, gadgets and building respectively.

(The titles for Series 1 and 2 are from Digiguide)

Series 1
 1.  Stars 
 2.  Do We All Smell Different? 
 3.  Amazing Maze 
 4.  Trumpet 
 5.  Snowballs 
 6.  Eyebrows 
 7.  What's Cooking? 
 8.  All Bunged Up  
 9.  Nina Needs A Wee 
 10.  Spy kit 
 11.  Granny's Glasses 
 12.  Where's The Bad Smell? 
 13.  Wakey Wakey 
 14.  Why Is My Tongue Wet? 
 15.  Shadows 
 16.  Birthday Surprise
 17.  Different Tastes 
 18.  Monster Hunt 
 19.  Making Music 
 20.  Distance 
 21.  Staying Cool 
 22.  Too Much Salt 
 23.  Bud Needs Help 
 24.  Echoes 
 25.  Colours

Series 2
 1.  Hide And Seek 
 2.  Getting Goosebumps 
 3.  Nina's Cake Bake 
 4.  I Can See A Rainbow 
 5.  Terrific Teeth 
 6.  Touching The Clouds 
 7.  Smelly Feet 
 8.  In A Spin  
 9.  Bubble Trouble 
 10.  Fun In The Sun 
 11.  Tummy Rumbles 
 12.  Finding Flowers 
 13.  Lovely Lollies 
 14.  Brilliant Bones 
 15.  Rumbling Thunder 
 16.  Nina Gets Nosey 
 17.  What A Fright 
 18.  Let's Hear It For Ears 
 19.  Making Waves 
 20.  Splish Splash 
 21.  Baby Talk 
 22.  Funny Honey 
 23.  Digging Dogs 
 24.  When the Wind Blows 
 25.  Tremendous Toes

Go Eco
 1.  Branching Out 
 2.  Food, Glorious Food 
 3.  Keeping Cosy 
 4.  Super Slimy Slugs 
 5.  Mouldy Food 
 6.  Something Fishy 
 7.  Recycling 
 8.  Flying High 
 9.  Monkey Business 
 10.  Every Drop Counts

Go Inventing
 1. Bouncy Beds
 2. Pen and Paper
 3. Loud and Clear
 4. In the Box
 5. Mirror Mirror 
 6. Wheels 
 7. Clean It Up 
 8. Lift Off 
 9. Round and Round 
 10. Get Wet 
 11. Sliding Doors 
 12. Handy Handles 
 13. Cooking With Waves
 14. Time for Cogs 
 15. Hot and Cold 
 16. Buckle Up 
 17. Dirty Dishes 
 18. Top Taps
 19. Keys 
 20. Eyes in the Dark 
 21. Near and Far
 22. Hubble Bubble 
 23. In a Flush 
 24. Extraordinary X-Rays 
 25. Swish Swish

In the Lab
 1.  Melty Chocolate
 2.  Sleepy Dust 
 3.  Rattling Pan 
 4.  Burnt Toast 
 5.  Sugar and Teeth 
 6.  Super Sand 
 7.  Ferocious Fire 
 8.  Soap Suds 
 9.  Boats Float 
 10.  Grass Stains 
 11.  Salty Sea 
 12.  Wobbly Jelly
 13.  Steamy Mirrors 
 14.  Fragrant Flowers 
 15.  Noisy Foods 
 16.  Popcorn Pops 
 17.  Sniffing Smells 
 18.  Mighty Metal 
 19.  Sticky Jam 
 20.  Bubbles Burst 
 21.  Onions Make Us Cry 
 22.  Wrinkly Fingers 
 23.  Glow Stars 
 24.  Wet Paint 
 25.  Marvellous Milk

Brilliant Bodies
 1.  Heart
 2.  Handy Hands
 3.  Sneeze
 4.  Two Ears
 5.  Blood
 6.  Brain
 7.  Wrinkly Face
 8.  Earwax 
 9.  Exercise
 10. Tickly Feet
 11. Yawn
 12. Digestion
 13. Sleep
 14. Eyelashes
 15. Bellybuttons
 16. Scabs
 17. Eyes See
 18. Burp
 19. Spine
 20. Breath
 21. Skin
 22. Balance
 23. Memory
 24. Broken Bones
 25. Fingertips Feel

Go Engineering 
 1.  Aeroplanes 
 2.  Glass 
 3.  Electricity 
 4.  Bin Lorry 
 5.  Hovercraft 
 6.  Robots 
 7.  Cranes 
 8.  Hot Air Balloons 
 9.  Ships 
 10.  Roads 
 11.  Tunnels 
 12.  Cereal 
 13.  Cable Cars 
 14.  Steam Pump 
 15.  DVDs 
 16.  Diving (Not To Be Confused With The Same Title From The 9th Series: Get Sporty)
 17.  Luggage 
 18.  Biscuits 
 19.  Cars 
 20.  Computers 
 21.  Tall Buildings 
 22.  Canal Locks 
 23.  Sticky Fabric 
 24.  Bridges (Not To Be Confused With The Same Title From The 11th Series: Get Building)
 25.  Mobile Phones

Earth Explorers
 1.  Space Rockets 
 2.  Grand Canyon 
 3.  Sand Dunes 
 4.  Living in Space 
 5.  Mountains 
 6.  Volcanoes 
 7.  Giant's Causeway 
 8.  Solar System 
 9.  Rivers 
 10.  Exploring Space 
 11.  Cliffs 
 12.  Night and Day 
 13.  Dinosaurs 
 14.  Living on Earth 
 15.  Stripy Rocks 
 16.  Geysers 
 17.  Loch Ness 
 18.  Moon Shape 
 19.  Caves 
 20.  Shooting Stars 
 21.  Coal 
 22.  Earth Is Round 
 23.  Deserts 
 24.  Gravity 
 25.  Waterfalls

Get Sporty
 1.  Cycling 
 2.  Curling 
 3.  Football 
 4.  Trampolining 
 5.  Climbing 
 6.  Rugby 
 7.  Marathon 
 8.  Sprinting 
 9.  Swimming 
 10.  Long Jump 
 11.  Snooker 
 12.  Gymnastics 
 13.  Diving (Not To Be Confused With The Same Title From The 7th Series: Go Engineering)
 14.  Cricket 
 15.  Basketball

Go Digital
 1.  Driverless Cars 
 2.  Internet 
 3.  3D Printing 
 4.  Coding 
 5.  Animation

Get Building
 1.  Triangles 
 2.  Pointy Roofs 
 3.  Piers 
 4.  Nests 
 5.  Houses 
 6.  Windmills 
 7.  Beaver Dams 
 8.  Skyscrapers 
 9.  Bridges (Not To Be Confused With The Same Title From The 7th Series: Go Engineering) 
 10.  Demolition 
 11.  Floating Houses 
 12.  Rollercoasters 
 13.  Arches 
 14.  Lighthouses 
 15.  Living Underwater 
 16.  Living Underground 
 17.  Igloo 
 18.  Spiders
 19.  Domes 
 20.  Amphitheatres

References

External links
 Glasgow Science Centre Activity Booklet

BBC children's television shows
British computer-animated television series
CBeebies
Science education television series
2000s British children's television series
2010s British children's television series
British preschool education television series
2000s preschool education television series
2010s preschool education television series
Television series by BBC Studios
English-language television shows